Ennistymon parish is a parish in County Clare and part of the Kilfenora Deanery of the Roman Catholic Diocese of Galway, Kilmacduagh and Kilfenora. In the past, the parish was named Kilmanaheen. It is centred upon the villages of Ennistymon and Lahinch.

Current (2021) parish priest is William Cummins and current curate is Des Forde.

The parish is amalgamated with the former parish of Clooney.

The main church of the parish is the Church of Our Lady and St Michael in Ennistymon, built in 1954 by Fr. John Jennings. The second church of the parish is the Church of Our Lady The Immaculate Conception in Lahinch, also built in 1954. Both 1954 churches replaced older churches. The third church of the parish is the Church of St. Columba in Clouna, built in 1846 by Fr. John Sheehan.

In the townland Furglan, the old national school was used as a auxiliary church. Later on, it was closed due to changing demands.

References

Parishes of the Roman Catholic Diocese of Galway, Kilmacduagh and Kilfenora